Sulafjellet (English: The Sula mountain) is the highest mountain on the island of Sula in Western Norway. The summit known as "Vardane" is 776 meters above sea level. The mountain covers most of the island's area.

References